The 2003 San Jose State Spartans football team represented San Jose State University in the 2003 NCAA Division I-A football season. The team played their home games at Spartan Stadium in San Jose, California. They participated as members of the Western Athletic Conference. They were coached by head coach Fitz Hill.

Personnel

Coaching staff

Roster

Schedule

Game summaries

Grambling State

at Florida

at Stanford

Nevada

at Rice

SMU

at Boise State

Hawaii

at UTEP

at Fresno State

Tulsa

References

San Jose State
San Jose State Spartans football seasons
San Jose State Spartans football